Junan may refer to:

Junan County, in Shandong, China
Junan, an older romanization of Runan County (汝南縣), in Henan, China
Jun'an, Guangdong, town in Foshan, Guangdong, China
Guotai Junan Securities, investment bank in China
Nakagawa Jun'an (1739–1786), Japanese doctor and botanist